Hamengkubuwono is the current ruling royal house of the Yogyakarta Sultanate in the Special Region of Yogyakarta of Indonesia. The reigning Sultan of Yogyakarta is the hereditary Governor of the Special Region (Act No. 13 of 2012, article 18 paragraph 1c) with terms of 5 years (article 25 paragraph 1) without bounded by periodic provision (article 25 paragraph 2), as normally applied to such public office. The current Sultan is Hamengkubuwono X.

Honorifics
As with many significant historical and respected figures in Javanese culture, the name of a ruler is usually preceded by honorifics – in most cases the usage is of Sri Sultan before the name.  In full titles the first Hamengkubuwono was titled:

"Ngarsadalem Sampeyandalem Hingkang Sinuhun Kangjeng Sultan Hamengkubuwono, Senopati Ing Ngalaga Ngabdurrahman Sayidin Panatagama Kalifatulah, Hingkang Jumeneng Kaping I".

Etymology 

For some Javanese, the name has been interpreted as having the following components:
Hamangku: pleased to serve the people
Hamengku: protect the people in a just way
Hamengkoni: ready to take responsibility of a leader
Buwono: the Javanese universe
Such an explanation does not necessarily coincide with strict etymology of the word.

List of Sultans of Yogyakarta (1755–present)
This list is of ruling dates, see specific articles for birth dates.

|-
|Hamengkubuwono IBendara Raden Mas Sujono13 February 1755–24 March 1792
|
|Kartasura6 August 1717 Son of Amangkurat IV
|Gusti Kanjeng Ratu Katipaten
|Yogyakarta24 March 1792 Aged 
|
|
|-
|Hamengkubuwono IIGusti Raden Mas Sundoro 2 April 1792–31 December 1810
|
|Yogyakarta7 March 1750Son of Hamengkubuwono I
| 
|Yogyakarta3 January 1828 Aged 
|1st reign 
|
|-
|Hamengkubuwono IIIRaden Mas Surojo 31 December 1810–28 December 1811()
|
|Yogyakarta20 February 1769Son of Hamengkubuwono II
| GKR Ageng
|Yogyakarta3 November 1814Aged 
|1st reign 
|
|-
|Hamengkubuwono IIGusti Raden Mas Sundoro 28 December 1811–21 June 1812
|
|Yogyakarta7 March 1750Son of Hamengkubuwono I
|
|Yogyakarta3 January 1828 Aged 
|2nd reign
|
|-
|Hamengkubuwono IIIRaden Mas Surojo 28 June 1812–3 November 1814()
|
|Yogyakarta20 February 1769Son of Hamengkubuwono II
| GKR Ageng
|Yogyakarta3 November 1814Aged 
|2nd reign 
|
|-
|Hamengkubuwono IVRaden Mas Ibnu Jarot 9 November 1814–6 December 1823()
|
|Yogyakarta3 April 1804Son of Hamengkubuwono III
| 
|Yogyakarta6 December 1823Aged 
|
|
|-
|Hamengkubuwono VRaden Mas Gathot Menol 19 December 1823–17 August 1826()
|
|Yogyakarta20 January 1820Son of Hamengkubuwono IV
| –
|Yogyakarta5 June 1855Aged 
|1st reign
|
|-
|Hamengkubuwono IIGusti Raden Mas Sundoro 17 August 1826–3 January 1828()
|
|Yogyakarta7 March 1750Son of Hamengkubuwono I
| 
|Yogyakarta3 January 1828 Aged 
|3rd reign
|
|-
|Hamengkubuwono VRaden Mas Gathot Menol 17 January 1828–June 5, 1855()
|
|Yogyakarta20 January 1820Son of Hamengkubuwono IV
| Gusti Kanjeng Ratu Kadhaton
|Yogyakarta5 June 1855Aged 
|2nd reign
|
|-
|Hamengkubuwono VIRaden Mas Mustojo 5 July 1855–20 July 1877()
|
|Yogyakarta10 August 1821Brother of Hamengkubuwono V
| GKR Kencono
|Yogyakarta20 July 1877Aged 
|
|
|-
|Hamengkubuwono VIIRaden Mas Murtejo 22 December 1877–29 January 1921()
|
|Yogyakarta4 February 1839Son of Hamengkubuwono VI
|
|Yogyakarta30 December 1831Aged 
|
|
|-
|Hamengkubuwono VIIIRaden Mas Sujadi 8 February 1921–22 October 1939()
|
|Yogyakarta3 March 1880Son of Hamengkubuwono VII
|41 children
|Yogyakarta22 October 1939Aged 
|
|
|-
|Hamengkubuwono IXRaden Mas Dorodjatun 18 March 1940–2 October 1988()
|
|Yogyakarta12 August 1912Son of Hamengkubuwono VIII
|20 children
|Washington, D.C.2 October 1988Aged 
|Also served as Governor of Yogyakarta (1945–1988) and Vice President of Indonesia (1973–1978)
|
|-
|Hamengkubuwono XRaden Mas Herjuno Darpito 7 March 1989–present()
|
|Yogyakarta2 April 1946Son of Hamengkubuwono IX
|Gusti Kanjeng Ratu Hemas(Tatiek Drajad Supriastuti) 5 children
|LivingAge 
|Also served as Governor of Yogyakarta (1998–present)
|
|}

Timeline

Notes

References

See also
History of Yogyakarta
Susuhunan
List of monarchs of Java

Further reading

 Ricklefs, M.C. (1974) Jogjakarta under Sultan Mangkubumi, 1749–1792: A history of the division of Java . London Oriental Series, vol. 30. London : Oxford University Press,  (Revised Indonesian edition 2002)
 

Indonesian families
Burials at Imogiri
Noble titles of Indonesia

id:Daftar Raja Jawa#Mataram Baru